Stanford Morris Lyman (June 10, 1933 – March 9, 2003) was an American sociologist. He is recognized for his work on interactionism and the sociology of race relations in the United States. He served as president of the Mid-South Sociological Association, and he co-founded the American Sociological Association's Section on Asian/Asian American sociology. He was also a founder of the International Journal of Politics, Culture, and Society. He died of liver cancer on March 9, 2003.

References

1933 births
2003 deaths
American sociologists
University of California, Berkeley alumni
The New School faculty
Florida Atlantic University faculty
Deaths from liver cancer